Furin is a protease, a proteolytic enzyme that in humans and other animals is encoded by the FURIN gene. Some proteins are inactive when they are first synthesized, and must have sections removed in order to become active. Furin cleaves these sections and activates the proteins. It was named furin because it was in the upstream region of an oncogene known as FES. The gene was known as FUR (FES Upstream Region) and therefore the protein was named furin. Furin is also known as PACE (Paired basic Amino acid Cleaving Enzyme). A member of family S8, furin is a subtilisin-like peptidase.

Function 
The protein encoded by this gene is an enzyme that belongs to the subtilisin-like proprotein convertase family. The members of this family are proprotein convertases that process latent precursor proteins into their biologically active products. This encoded protein is a calcium-dependent serine endoprotease that can efficiently cleave precursor proteins at their paired basic amino acid processing sites. Some of its substrates are: proparathyroid hormone, transforming growth factor beta 1 precursor, proalbumin, pro-beta-secretase, membrane type-1 matrix metalloproteinase, beta subunit of pro-nerve growth factor and von Willebrand factor. A furin-like pro-protein convertase has been implicated in the processing of RGMc (also called hemojuvelin), a gene involved in a severe iron-overload disorder called juvenile hemochromatosis. Both the Ganz and Rotwein groups demonstrated that furin-like proprotein convertases (PPC) are responsible for conversion of 50 kDa HJV to a 40 kDa protein with a truncated COOH-terminus, at a conserved polybasic RNRR site. This suggests a potential mechanism to generate the soluble forms of HJV/hemojuvelin (s-hemojuvelin) found in the blood of rodents and humans.

The furin substrates and the locations of furin cleavage sites in protein sequences can be predicted by two bioinformatics methods: ProP and PiTou.

Clinical significance 

Furin is one of the proteases responsible for the proteolytic cleavage of HIV envelope polyprotein precursor gp160 to gp120 and gp41 prior to viral assembly. This protease is also thought to play a role in tumor progression. The use of alternate polyadenylation sites has been found for the FURIN gene.

Furin is enriched in the Golgi apparatus, where it functions to cleave other proteins into their mature/active forms. Furin cleaves proteins just downstream of a basic amino acid target sequence (canonically, Arg-X-(Arg/Lys) -Arg'). In addition to processing cellular precursor proteins, furin is also utilized by a number of pathogens. For example, the envelope proteins of viruses such as HIV, influenza, dengue fever, several filoviruses including ebola and marburg virus, and the spike protein of SARS-CoV-2, must be cleaved by furin or furin-like proteases to become fully functional. When SARS-CoV-2 virus is being synthesized in an infected cell, furin or furin-like proteases cleave the spike protein into two portions (S1 and S2), which remain associated.

Anthrax toxin, pseudomonas exotoxin, and papillomaviruses must be processed by furin during their initial entry into host cells. Inhibitors of furin are under consideration as therapeutic agents for treating anthrax infection.

Furin is regulated by cholesterol and substrate presentation. When cholesterol is high, furin traffics to GM1 lipid rafts. When cholesterol is low, furin traffics to the disordered region. This is speculated to contribute to cholesterol and age dependent priming of SARS-CoV.

Expression of furin in T-cells is required for maintenance of peripheral immune tolerance.

Interactions 

Furin has been shown to interact with PACS1.

References

Further reading

External links 
 
 

EC 3.4.21